Aleisanthiopsis is a genus of flowering plants in the family Rubiaceae. It consists of only two species, both of which are endemic to the Kalimantan region of Indonesian Borneo.

Species 
 Aleisanthiopsis distantiflora (Merr.) Tange - Kalimantan
 Aleisanthiopsis multiflora Tange - Kalimantan

References

External links 
 Aleisanthiopsis in the World Checklist of Rubiaceae

Rubiaceae genera
Aleisanthieae